is a  2001 Japanese film loosely based on the classical work of Heian-period Japanese literature, The Tale of Genji,  directed by Tonkō Horikawa and written by Akira Hayasaka.

Cast
 Sayuri Yoshinaga as Murasaki Shikibu
 Yūki Amami as Hikaru Genji
 Haruma Miura
 Reiko Takashima
 Hirotarō Honda
 Junkichi Orimoto as Kakuzen
 Ken Watanabe as Fujiwara no Michinaga
 Mitsuko Mori

Awards
 The Japanese Academy Award for "Best Art Direction" - Yoshinobu Nishioka (2002)

References

External links 
 
 

2001 films
Works based on The Tale of Genji
Films based on Japanese novels
Films set in feudal Japan
Films with screenplays by Akira Hayasaka
Films scored by Isao Tomita
2000s Japanese films